The 2008 Kororoit state by-election was held on 28 June 2008 for the Victorian Legislative Assembly seat of Kororoit. The by-election was triggered when Labor MLA and former state Police Minister Andre Haermeyer resigned from parliament on 3 June. It was held on the same day as the by-election for the Victorian federal seat of Gippsland.

Kororoit was the third-safest seat in the state for the governing Labor Party, based on the results of the 2006 state election. The opposition Liberal Party contested the by-election, with state president David Kemp stating that the party would mount a "strong campaign". There had earlier been reports that the party might not run a candidate, as had been the case in the 2007 by-elections for the safe Labor seats of Albert Park and Williamstown.

Labor candidate Marlene Kairouz was elected as the new member for Kororoit.

Results

Distribution of preferences

Because Labor attained an absolute majority of formal votes after the elimination of two candidates, no formal two candidate preferred count was determined for this contest.

References

External links
 ABC Kororoit by-election

Victorian state by-elections
2008 elections in Australia
2000s in Victoria (Australia)